SQIFF (Scottish Queer International Film Festival) is Scotland's only active dedicated LGBTQ+ film festival.

Created in 2014, with a series of one off screenings, the festival launched fully in 2015 and became an annual event. The festival arose in response to the amount of queer filmmaking activity in Glasgow, but quickly established an International programme featuring submissions from around the world. It seeks to provide a platform for LGBTQ+ creativity, as well as challenging barriers to access.

Festival 
The first edition of SQIFF took place between 24–27 September 2015 at the Centre for Contemporary Arts, which has continued to operate as the main festival hub. Additional screenings have taken place at venues across the city. These have included: Glasgow Film Theatre, Scottish Youth Theatre, Kinning Park Complex, Glasgow School of Art, and The Space.

To connect queer audiences during the Covid-19 pandemic, SQIFF launched Sqifflex, an online platform hosting a collection of LGBTQ+ films for free, during May and June 2020.

The Festival Co-ordinator was Helen Wright, until 2021. Helen co-founded the festival with Marc David Jacobs. A new programming team started in 2021, introducing Nat Lall and Jamie Rea as Co-Programmers, with Indigo Korres as Producer.

Accessibility 
SQIFF modelled a sliding scale 'pay what you can' ticket tier scheme, inspired by other grassroots festivals, which has since been implemented by Scottish festivals. Closed captioning was required for all films, and the Festival has a captioning team to assist in this. Events are BSL interpreted. Venues must be wheelchair accessible. Quiet rooms were also available at some spaces. There is an access fund to help people attend.

See also 
List of LGBT film festivals

References 

Film festivals in Scotland
LGBT film festivals in the United Kingdom
2014 establishments in Scotland